Gate II is the third album released by Japanese pop rock trio Iceman on May 21, 1998. It is also the first in a small series of albums released by Iceman from 1999 until their official departure from the Japanese music scene in 2003. This series includes three studio albums (Gate II, Gate I, and Gate//White), as well as 1 remix album and 1 “analog” album (gate out - 1st remix album and gate out - 1st analog album, respectively). This album also contains the single “Shining Collection,” which since its use in the anime Gravitation, has gained a substantial following among the anime/manga community.

Track listing

References
 Iceman/DA Family fansite
 Album Artwork 

1999 albums
Iceman (Japanese band) albums